Gunnawarra is a rural locality in the Tablelands Region, Queensland, Australia.

Location
From further west it can be accessed via the Kennedy Highway.

History
The name Gunnawarra comes from the pastoral property established by Walter Jervoise Scott and his brother Arthur Jervoise Scott, and is derived from Aboriginal words gunnaya meaning camp and warra meaning small.

Geography
The Herbert River forms most of the eastern boundary.

Road infrastructure
The Kennedy Highway crosses the north-west corner from the north. Ootann Road enters from the north-west.

Heritage listings 
Gunnawarra has a number of heritage-listed sites, including:
 Gunnawarra Road: Gunnawarra Homestead

Tourism
Gunnawarra is the start and end of two sections of the Bicentennial National Trail.

References

Tablelands Region
Localities in Queensland